Graph Rewriting and Transformation (GReAT) is a  Model Transformation Language (MTL) for Model Integrated Computing available in the GME environment. GReAT has a rich pattern specification sublanguage, a graph transformation sublanguage and a high level control-flow sublanguage. It has been designed to address the specific needs of the model transformation area. The GME environment is an example of a Model Driven Engineering (MDE) framework.

See also
 ATLAS Transformation Language
 CoSMIC
 Domain Specific Language (DSL)
 Domain-specific modelling (DSM)
 Model-based testing (MBT)
 Meta-Object Facility
 Meta-modeling
 VIATRA
 XMI
 OCL
 QVT

References
 GReAT  ref 1
 GReAT  ref 2
 GReAT  ref 3 [broken link]
  GReAT   ref 4  [broken link]
 GReAT   ref 5 [broken link]
  GReAT   ref 6 [broken link]
  GReAT   ref 7
 GReAT   ref 8
 GReAT   ref 9 [broken link]

Graph rewriting